Özgenur Yurtdagülen, a.k.a. Özge Nur Yurtdagülen, (born August 6, 1993) is a Turkish female volleyball player. Currently, she plays for Galatasaray in the middle blocker position. Yurtdagülen is a member of the Turkey women's national volleyball team.

She is a student of Business Administration at Bahçeşehir University.

Career

Clubs
Yurtdagülen began her sports career at the age of eleven in Yeşilyurt, and played there in all age categories. In June 2012, she transferred to Galatasaray.

National team
She played in the Turkey girl's and junior women's national team.
She was called up to the Turkey women's national volleyball team, and played at the 2014 Women's European Volleyball League that won the gold medal.

Awards

National team
 2014 Women's European Volleyball League -  champion
 2015 FIVB Volleyball Women's U23 World Championship -

See also
 Turkish women in sports

References

External links
Özgenur Yurtdagülan at Scoresway

1993 births
Turkish women's volleyball players
Yeşilyurt volleyballers
Galatasaray S.K. (women's volleyball) players
Bahçeşehir University alumni
Living people
Turkey women's international volleyball players
Competitors at the 2018 Mediterranean Games
Mediterranean Games bronze medalists for Turkey
Mediterranean Games medalists in volleyball
20th-century Turkish sportswomen
21st-century Turkish sportswomen